Borinci is a hamlet in  Vukovar-Syrmia County, Croatia. It is administratively located in the town of Vinkovci as a part of the settlement of Vinkovci itself.

Name
The name of the village in Croatian is plural.

Tower 

Near Borinci, there is a 171m tall guyed mast for FM-/TV-broadcasting.

References

Populated places in Vukovar-Syrmia County